The Alameda County Board of Supervisors is the five member non-partisan governing board of Alameda County, California. Members of the Board of supervisors are elected from districts, based on their residence.

History
The board was created in 1855, with the first supervisor meeting held at the San Leandro courthouse April 2, 1855. From the creation of the county in 1853 to the creation of the first board of supervisors in 1855, Alameda County was governed by a Court of Sessions, a special provisional form, combining executive, legislative and judicial functions.

Districts

Governance 
Within the broad limits established by the State Constitution, State General Law, and the Alameda County Charter, the Board exercises both the legislative and the executive functions of government. The Board of Supervisors is also the governing body for a number of "special districts" within Alameda County.

Boundaries are adjusted every ten years through the process called "redistricting" to make the supervisorial districts equal in population. Redistricting was last completed in 2001. Terms of office for the Supervisors are four years.

Alternate elections are held every two years for three supervisors and then for two supervisors. The salary of the Board members is fixed by the Board itself. A President of the Board, chosen from the membership of the Board every two years, presides at all meetings of the Board and appoints committees to handle work involving the major programs of the County.

Duties of the Board of Supervisors 

As defined by the Alameda County Charter, the duties of the Board of Supervisors are as follows:
 Appoint most County officers and employees, except elected officials
 Provide for the compensation of all County officials and employees
 Create officers, boards, and commissions as needed, appointing the members and fixing the terms of office
 Award all contracts for public works.
 Adopt an annual budget.
 Provide, publish, and enforce a complete code of rules prescribing the duties and the systems of * office and management, accounts, and reports for each County department.
 Have an annual audit made of all County accounts, books, and records.
 Supervise the operations of departments and exercise executive and administrative authority throughout County government.
 Serve as appellate body for employee grievances, planning and zoning.

Board Meetings 
The Board of Supervisors meets Tuesday mornings at the County Administration Building in Oakland, at 1221 Oak Street. Meetings are open to the public.

Former supervisors
Tom Bates, 21st mayor of Berkeley
Thomas E. Caldecott
Don Perata
John George
Warren Widener
William Dutton Hayward, namesake of the city of Hayward
Francis K. Shattuck
Gail Steele was formerly the supervisor of district 2 for 18 years. The Gail Steele Wellness and Recovery Center is named for her. It is located in Hayward, and is a division of the Alameda County Health Care Services Agency and the Behavioral Health Care Services Agency of the county.
Kent D. Pursel (b 1904, San Francisco), supervisor, 1952-1964+. A section of Interstate 80 was dedicated to his memory.

Nadia Davis-Lockyer
Nadia Davis-Lockyer (Board of Supervisors, November 2010 - April 20, 2012), an Orange County native, has worked as a public interest law attorney since 1997. She previously served as Executive Director of the Alameda County Family Justice Center. In January 2010, she was appointed to the Board of Governors of the California Community Colleges System by Governor Arnold Schwarzenegger. She was elected to the Board of Supervisors in the November 2010 election, but resigned her position in April 2012 while undergoing treatment in a rehabilitation center for chemical dependency after a highly publicized incident at a Newark hotel room in which she called police claiming her former boyfriend had assaulted her.
 In an interview with the San Jose Mercury News immediately after her resignation, Mrs. Lockyer explained previous statements she made concerning her addiction issues. After "initially claiming" her former boyfriend had "hacked into her email, she admitted she was the author of an email to a reporter" blaming her husband, then-California State Treasurer Bill Lockyer, for "buying and supplying her with drugs years ago -- an allegation his office called "utterly false." Mrs. Lockyer said she "regretted" sending the message," and asked "the public not to hold anything against my husband for actions that happened a long time ago." Later that year, in August 2012, Mrs. Lockyer was arrested in Orange County , charged with felony methamphetamine possession. The Orange County District Attorney subsequently dropped the charges, and Lockyer then completed a rehabilitation program. She has since resumed the practice of law with a firm in Newport Beach, and lives in Long Beach with her husband, now in private law practice.

Special appointment
Among the candidates being considered for the special appointment to replace Lockyer on the board were local politicians Alberto Torrico, Richard Valle, Mark Salinas, Union City Mayor Mark Green and Ana Apodaca. On June 11, the 4 other board members voted unanimously to appoint Valle as supervisor. He served until November 2012, at which time a special election was held to choose who would serve the final 2 years of the 4-year term. Valle won the election, against Mary Hayashi and Green.

References

External links 

Board of Supervisors website
Redirect to About Board of Supervisors About the Board of Supervisors
County Supervisors, 1855–1885
County Supervisors, 1885–present

County government in California
Government of Alameda County, California
Organizations based in Oakland, California
1855 establishments in California